Henry I, Lord of Heinsberg (died 1259) was a German nobleman. He was the second son of Gottfried III, Count of Sponheim and ruled as lord of Heinsberg from 1228 until his death.

House of Sponheim

1259 deaths
1224 births